, abbreviated as , is a Japanese  manga series written and illustrated by Kaede Kōchi. It was serialized in The Hana to Yume and Hana to Yume from 2008 to 2015. The story follows the everyday life of high schooler Shiharu Nakamura as she babysits the twin niece and nephew of local TV announcer Seiji Matsunaga. In April 2016, Kōchi launched a sequel titled Life So Happy which follows the twins as they go into the fifth grade.

Premise
Shiharu Nakamura is a high school girl who works at a daycare where twins Aoi and Akane Matsunaga go. The twins are in custody of their uncle, Seiji, because their father abandoned them after his wife suddenly died. One day when Seiji goes to pick up the twins from day care, he notices that they are particularly attached to Shiharu in comparison to the other workers. He hires Shiharu as their personal babysitter as he is very busy with work.

Characters

Shiharu is a high school student who works at The Sunflower House daycare. She becomes acquainted with Akane and Aoi Matsunaga and begins babysitting them later. She is hired to babysit them by their uncle Seiji Matsunaga, who pays her double of what she makes at the daycare. Shiharu shows aspirations to be self-sufficient and is hard working. She eventually falls in love with Seiji, but keeps it to herself, as there is a large age gap between them. At the end of the manga, she gets together with Seiji after he kisses her at the park.

Seiji works at JX Television as a TV announcer, and thus as a busy schedule with unpredictable hours. He becomes the guardian of Akane and Aoi Matsunaga, his young niece and nephew, after they are abandoned by their father, who is Seiji's brother. It is revealed that Seiji's family as a youth was troubling, and he was often by himself. His parents divorce by the time he begins college. Because he comes from a dysfunctional family, he wishes to someday have a family of his own and to not make the same mistakes his family did. He confesses his love to Shiharu but asks to wait to hear her response until she is as old as he is.

 & 
Akane and Aoi are fraternal twins who are two years old at the start of the series. They live with their uncle Seiji, whom they call Sei-tan, after the death of their mother and abandonment of their father. At the end of the series they go to live with their maternal grandparents and their father. It is hinted that Aoi has a crush on Shiharu. Aoi and Akane treat Shiharu as their "mother".

Shiharu's best friend and classmate. She ends up dating Seiji's neighbor and friend Takeru Miyagawa.

A childhood friend of Seiji's who is a university student. He is very easygoing and childish, making him get along with the twins well. He dates Shiharu's friend Rio.

Seiji's older brother and the father of Akane and Aoi. After the sudden death of his wife, Misaki, he is grief stricken and abandons his children. At the end of the series, he has recomposed himself and decides to live with Akane and Aoi again with the help of Misaki's parents.

Kōichi's wife who dies in a car accident.

Media

Manga
Written and illustrated by Kaede Kōchi, Love So Life premiered in Hakusensha's The Hana to Yume magazine in 2008. The series transferred to Hana to Yume magazine in 2009, reaching its conclusion on July 18, 2015. Hakusensha collected the individual chapters into seventeen  (compiled volumes) published under the Hana to Yume Comics imprint. A sequel manga series, Life So Happy, premiered in Hana to Yume on April 5, 2016, transferring to The Hana to Yume on January 25, 2018. Three  have been published under the Hana to Yume Comics imprint as of April 19, 2019.

Drama CDs
Love So Life inspired two audio drama CDs. The first, produced by Marine Entertainment, was released in Japan on March 25, 2010. It starred Mamiko Noto as Shiharu, Daisuke Ono as Seiji, and Miyuki Sawashiro as Akane and Aoi. The second, produced by Hakusensha, was released in Japan on October 4, 2013, bundled with an issue of Hana to Yume magazine. The original voice cast reprised their roles.

Manga sales
Volumes of the series have ranked in listings of top selling manga in Japan:

References

External links
 
 Love So Life at Media Arts Database 

2008 manga
Hakusensha manga
Shōjo manga